Tmesisternus gabrieli is a species of beetle in the family Cerambycidae. It was described by Bernhard Schwarzer in 1931. It is known from Papua New Guinea.

References

gabrieli
Beetles described in 1931